The Novant Health Charlotte Marathon is an annual marathon which takes place in Charlotte, North Carolina, every November.  It was previously called Thunder Road Marathon and used to feature a NASCAR theme in keeping with the region's close ties to auto racing.

The event was started in 2005 after the Charlotte Observer Marathon came to an end.  The race course, a loop which begins and ends in Uptown Charlotte, is certified and is a Boston Marathon qualifier.

In 2010 due to the increasing popularity of marathon events nationwide, it was announced that entries would be capped at 3500, although the actual number of entrants has never reached that level.
The event was renamed the Novant Health Charlotte Marathon in February 2016.

Races
The Charlotte Marathon consists of 3 different races with the headline event being the marathon. However the largest number of participants are in the half marathon, which is run on the first half of the full marathon course.

Record

Marathon Entrants & Finishers

References

External links
 Official Website of Charlotte Marathon

Marathons in the United States
Sports competitions in Charlotte, North Carolina